Al Gharafa Doha is a Qatari professional basketball club. The club competes in the Qatari Basketball League.

The club has traditionally provided Qatar's national basketball team with key players.

History
The team originally competed under the name Al-Ittihad and changed its name to Al-Gharafa before the 2005 season.

The team won the Qatari League in 2014.

Notable players

 Khalid Abdalla Adam
 Mychal Ammons
 Wayne Arnold
 Marcus Banks
 Nemanja Bešović
 Suleiman Braimoh
 Jordan Callahan
 Devan Downey
 Kevin Galloway
 Dominic James
 Jeremiah Massey
 Abdulrahman Mohamed Saad
 Franklin Session
 Eugene Spates
 Mike Taylor
 Justin Watts

See also
Al-Gharafa Sports Club

References

External links
Asia-Basket.com Team Page

Basketball teams in Doha
Basketball teams established in 1979